Scrotodynia is a condition characterized by dysesthesia of the scrotum.

See also 
 Vulvodynia
 List of cutaneous conditions

References 

Neurocutaneous conditions